Gaelcholáiste Chill Dara is an Irish language secondary level school (a Gaelcholáiste) in Naas, County Kildare, in Ireland. 

While Gaelscoil Chill Dara was founded in 1995, parents in this primary school wanted to provide post-primary education for their children through Irish. In 2002 the first full class finished their primary education in Gaelscoil Chill Dara. Parents started working on a secondary school while the Gaelscoil was still temporarily housed in Herbert Lodge.  The Gaelscoil moved to its present accommodation on the Green Road in June 2002 and with it grew the vision of a Gaelchampus.  It was the choice of parents, pupils (270 at the time and increasing), the Irish community, Newbridge Town Council and Irish organisations that Gael-Choláiste would start immediately.  The founders investigated alternative patronage and management structures in the pursuit of an all-Irish secondary education for our children and having done so adopted "An Foras Pátrúnachta" as the school's patron, it being the only patron who would guarantee the school's ethos and culture and so it also became part of the JMB structure. 
 
Within a year Gael-Choláiste Chill Dara welcomed its first group of students in September 2003.

As 2018, there were over 300 pupils attending Gael-Choláiste Chill Dara.

References

1995 establishments in Ireland
Educational institutions established in 1995
Gaelcholáiste
Irish-language schools and college
Naas
Secondary schools in County Kildare